Bottendorf is a district in the Gemeinde of Burgwald, located in Waldeck-Frankenberg, Hesse, Germany. According to the 2011 census, the population is roughly 1,950 individuals. With an area of 1.53 km², the population density of Bottendorf is 1,274/km².

References 

Villages in Hesse